Crooked Drunken Sons is an EP by the Street Dogs. It was released on 7" and as a digital download on Record Store Day, April 20, 2013, by Pirates Press Records. The title song is named after an annual tour the band has been doing. The songs were recorded in November 2012 at bassist Johnny Rioux's compound in Texas. The songs were originally meant to be demos for their next album, but the band liked them enough to release them as-is. One of the B-sides, "I Got Drunk", is an Uncle Tupelo cover.

Track listing

Side A 
 "Crooked Drunken Sons" – 4:12

Side B 
 "I Got Drunk" – 2:10
 "We All Fall Apart" – 2:26

Credits
Mike McColgan – vocals
Johnny Rioux – bass
Marcus Hollar – lead guitar
Tobe Bean III - rhythm guitar
Pete Sosa – drums

References

Street Dogs albums
Pirate Press Records albums
2013 EPs